Erythrobacter neustonensis  is a pleomorphic and aerobic bacteria from the genus Erythrobacter which has been isolated from a freshwater pond in Brisbane in Australia.

References

Further reading

External links
Type strain of Porphyrobacter neustonensis at BacDive -  the Bacterial Diversity Metadatabase

Sphingomonadales
Bacteria described in 1993